Mihkel Reimann (19 July 1889 Väätsa Parish, Järva County – 26 November 1968) was an Estonian politician. He was a member of VI Riigikogu (its Chamber of Deputies).

References

1889 births
1968 deaths
Members of the Riigivolikogu